The Brigadier is the student newspaper at The Citadel in Charleston, South Carolina.  The newspaper is a primarily published in blog form, with printed copies for major events during the school year.  .  Established in 1924 as The Bull Dog, the publication changed to its present name during the Presidency of General Mark W. Clark.  Until 2018, print editions were published biweekly from September through April by the Department of Cadet Activities, with free editions available on campus and mail subscriptions available for a nominal fee.  Beginning in 2018–19, the newspaper moved to its present online format.

References

1924 establishments in South Carolina
Newspapers established in 1924
Student newspapers published in South Carolina
The Citadel, The Military College of South Carolina student organizations